Barne Inlet is a reentrant (an inlet formed by two spurs of land) on the west side of the Ross Ice Shelf, on the coast of Antarctica. It lies between Cape Kerr and Cape Selborne.

It was discovered by the British National Antarctic Expedition (1901–1904) and named for Lieutenant Michael Barne, Royal Navy, a member of the expedition, who with Sub-Lieutenant George Mulock mapped the coastline this far south in 1903.

References 

Inlets of Antarctica
Hillary Coast